Moura is a city and a municipality in the District of Beja in Portugal, subdivided into 5 freguesias. The population in 2011 was 15,167, in an area of 958.46 km2. The city itself had a population of 8,459 in 2001. It has now around 11,000 inhabitants.

The current Mayor is José Pós de Mina, elected by the Unitary Democratic Coalition. The municipal holiday is 24 June.

It is home to Moura Photovoltaic Power Station, one of Europe's largest solar-power facilities.

Parishes
Administratively, the municipality is divided into 5 civil parishes (freguesias):
 Amareleja
 Moura (Santo Agostinho e São João Baptista) e Santo Amador
 Póvoa de São Miguel
 Safara e Santo Aleixo da Restauração
 Sobral da Adiça

Climate
Moura has a Mediterranean climate with very hot, dry summers and mild winters.

Town Twinning

Moura has cooperation agreements with the following cities:

 Aroche, Spain, since 1994
 Bissau, Guinea-Bissau, since 1997
 Amareleja-Valencia del Mombuey, Spain, since 2000
 Medjez El Bab, Tunisia, since 1995
 Roccagorga, Italy

Other towns with the same name include:

 Moura, Australia

Notable people 
 Corino Andrade (1906–2005) a leading neurologist and researcher who first described the familial amyloidotic polyneuropathy (FAP) syndrome
 Eunice Muñoz (born 1928 in Amareleja) a Portuguese actress
 Gonçalo Abecasis (born 1976) a Portuguese American biomedical researcher at the University of Michigan
 Miguel Garcia (born 1983) a former footballer with 228 club caps

Gallery

See also
Moura IPR

References

External links
Town Hall official website

 
Cities in Portugal
Populated places in Beja District
Municipalities of Beja District